Carex raddei is a tussock-forming perennial in the family Cyperaceae. It is native to eastern parts of Asia.

See also
 List of Carex species

References

raddei
Plants described in 1899
Taxa named by Georg Kükenthal
Flora of China
Flora of Mongolia
Flora of Korea
Flora of Russia